The Michigan State University College of Osteopathic Medicine (MSUCOM) is one of the two public medical schools of Michigan State University in East Lansing, Michigan. The college grants the Doctor of Osteopathic Medicine (D.O.) degree, as well as a DO-PhD combined degree for students interested in training as physician-scientists. MSUCOM operates two satellite campuses in Clinton Township and Detroit. The college is accredited by the American Osteopathic Association's Commission on Osteopathic College Accreditation (COCA) and by the Higher Learning Commission.

History
Michigan State University College of Osteopathic Medicine (MSUCOM) was founded at a time when new osteopathic medical schools were not being chartered. Many osteopathic doctors throughout Michigan began working on the creation of a new medical school.  In 1964, the Michigan Association of Osteopathic Physicians and Surgeons received a state charter and started to raise money for a new private osteopathic medical college. In 1969, the first class was admitted to the Michigan College of Osteopathic Medicine (MCOM) in Pontiac, Michigan, becoming the first osteopathic medical school to open since 1916.

That same year, the Michigan legislature passed P.A. 162, which stated that “A school of osteopathic medicine is established and shall be located as determined by the state board of education at an existing campus of a state university with an existing school or college of medicine." On September 19, 1969, Michigan State University accepted the legislative mandate and agreed to create a new osteopathic medical school on their campus, making it the first osteopathic medical school based at a public university. In 1971, MCOM was moved to East Lansing and was given its current name of MSUCOM. Myron S. Magan, D.O. was the first dean and served for more than two decades.

In the mid-2000s, MSUCOM expanded from its main campus in East Lansing to two satellite campuses in Detroit and Macomb. The expansion was approved by the MSU Board of Trustees in May 2007 and by the Commission on Osteopathic College Accreditation in September 2008. In July 2009, instruction began at these two expansion sites. In 2011, MSUCOM started a program for training Canadian students to become osteopathic physicians, accepting 25 Canadian students each year. In 2010, the partnership between MSU and Sparrow Hospital was strengthened. This agreement was meant to foster research, education, and clinical services, and it culminated in the creation of the Center for Innovation and Research in 2012. In December 2017, MSU and McLaren announced they were strengthening their partnership and that a new $450 million hospital would be built near MSU's East Lansing campus.

Academics
The college offers the Doctor of Osteopathic Medicine (D.O.) degree, as well as dual degrees (DO-PhD and DO-MBA). Applicant selection is made from a competitive applicant pool and depends on many aspects of the applicant such as GPA, MCAT, maturity, community service and life experiences. Among admitted students, the average GPA is 3.5–3.7 and the average MCAT score is 506–508.

Medical Curriculum
MSUCOM's curriculum consists of pre-clerkship years that run for seven semesters.  The first portion consists of introductory basic science, including: anatomy, biochemistry, genetics, physiology, etc. During this time, students also learn physical examination, doctor-patient interactions, and the principles of osteopathic palpatory diagnosis and manipulative therapy.  After learning the biological foundations, the curriculum shifts to a body system focus where the integumentary, neuro-musculoskeletal, hematopoietic, cardiovascular, respiratory, urinary, gastrointestinal, endocrine, and reproductive systems are detailed. Throughout the entire sequence, courses in Patient Care and Osteopathic Manipulative Medicine are incorporated.

After the first two years, the students are assigned a base hospital and begin their clerkship years where they rotate through family medicine, internal medicine, OBGYN, general surgery, psychiatry, etc.

DO-PhD Program
MSUCOM's DO-PhD Physician Scientist Training Program, the first of its kind in the nation, was founded by Dr. Veronica Maher and Dr. Justin McCormick in 1979.  The eight-year program is not organized in the traditional 2-4-2 MD-PhD arrangement, but starts with the first year of graduate coursework. This arrangement allows for more integration between the graduate research and medical school education. Most DO-PhD students complete PhDs through the BioMolecular Science program which includes: biochemistry, cell and molecular biology, genetics, microbiology, pharmacology & toxicology, and physiology. However, there are graduate students in neuroscience, epidemiology, anthropology, and sociology.  The alumni of the program have entered many prestigious residency programs and most graduates find careers in medical colleges, universities, or major medical research centers.

Pre-Clerkship Training Sites
The College of Osteopathic Medicine conducts pre-clinical training at three sites: East Lansing, Detroit and Macomb. MSUCOM's primary campus is in East Lansing on the main Michigan State University campus. The Detroit satellite campus is situated on the campus of the Detroit Medical Center (DMC). The Macomb satellite campus, the most recent to be added, is located at Macomb University Center within Macomb Community College.

Statewide Campus System
Clinical training for the third- and fourth-year students occurs at hospitals throughout Michigan affiliated with the Statewide Campus System. Currently, there are nearly 30 hospital locations affiliated with MSUCOM. In 2017, MSUCOM's Statewide Campus System was named as one of the five regional assessment training centers by the Accreditation Council for Graduate Medical Education. MSUCOM was the only DO medical school included.

Base Hospitals
Beaumont Hospitals- Beaumont Hospital, Farmington Hills and Beaumont Hospital, Trenton, Southshore Campus
Detroit Medical Center- Sinai-Grace Hospital and Huron Valley-Sinai Hospital
Garden City Hospital
Genesys Regional Medical Center
Henry Ford Health System- Henry Ford Allegiance Health, Henry Ford Macomb Hospital, and Henry Ford Wyandotte Hospital
Lakeland HealthCare
McLaren Health Care Corporation- McLaren–Greater Lansing Hospital, McLaren Bay Region, McLaren Macomb, and McLaren Oakland
Mercy Health Partners
Metro Health Hospital- University of Michigan Health
Munson Medical Center
Sparrow Health System- Sparrow Hospital
St. John Health Osteopathic Division
St. Joseph Mercy Ann Arbor

Other SCS Affiliated groups include: Detroit Metro Urological Surgery Consortium, Hamilton Community Network, Hillsdale Community Health Center, Oakwood Healthcare System Dearborn, ProMedica Coldwater Regional Hospital, ProMedical Toledo Hospital, St. Joseph Mercy Livingston and Oakland, and St. Mary Mercy Hospital.  Kirksville College of Osteopathic Medicine and Marian University College of Osteopathic Medicine are also affiliated with the SCS.

Notable alumni
 Sister Anne Brooks, D.O.
 Reuben Henderson, D.O.
 Thomas Naegele, D.O.- author of several books, including "Edible and Medicinal Plants of the Great Lakes Region."
 Steven Pitt, D.O. (deceased)
 Barbara Ross-Lee, D.O.- first African American woman to serve as dean of a U.S. osteopathic medical school.

References

External links
MSU COM website

Osteopathic medical schools in the United States
Michigan State University
Educational institutions established in 1969
1969 establishments in Michigan
Medical schools in Michigan